The gray-crested helmetshrike (Prionops poliolophus) is a species of bird in the Vanga family Vangidae, formerly usually included in the Malaconotidae.

It is found in Kenya and Tanzania. Its natural habitats are dry savanna and subtropical or tropical dry shrubland. It is threatened by habitat loss.

References

grey-crested helmetshrike
Birds of East Africa
grey-crested helmetshrike
grey-crested helmetshrike
Taxonomy articles created by Polbot